Maksim Vitalyevich Mashnyov (born 12 January 1993) is a Russian football midfielder who plays for Dynamo Vladivostok.

Club career
Mashnyov made his debut in the Russian Second Division for FC Baikal Irkutsk on 15 July 2012 in a game against FC Sakhalin Yuzhno-Sakhalinsk. He made his Russian Football National League debut for Baikal on 11 July 2015 in a game against FC Arsenal Tula.

On 15 July 2020, Mashnyov signed for FC Urartu.

References

External links
 

1993 births
Sportspeople from Irkutsk
Living people
Russian footballers
Association football midfielders
FC Arsenal Tula players
FC Luch Vladivostok players
FC Baikal Irkutsk players
FC Chayka Peschanokopskoye players
FC Urartu players
FC Tyumen players
Russian Second League players
Russian First League players
Armenian Premier League players
Russian expatriate footballers
Expatriate footballers in Armenia
Russian expatriate sportspeople in Armenia